Moshe Shmuel Shapiro (1917–2006) was a Rosh Yeshiva and important rabbinic figure in Israel.

Early life and education
Moshe Shmuel Shapiro's father, Aryeh Shapira, was the son of Refael Shapiro of Volozhin and grandson of Naftali Zvi Yehuda Berlin (the Netziv.) His mother was a descendant of Yom Tov Lipman Heilpern of Bialystock (1816–1879), a descendant of Yom-Tov Lipmann Heller. Even though his father was the Dayan of Białystok, Poland, Moshe Shmuel was born in the city of Minsk, Belarus, where his family had escaped the horrors of World War I.

After the war, the Shapira family returned to Białystok where Shapiro studied in the local yeshiva. Chaim Soloveitchik, Shapiro's uncle, frequented the Shapira residence. In 1933, Shapiro left home to study in the Baranovich Yeshiva under the tutelage of Rav Elchonon Wasserman. Shmuel Berenbaum, the Rosh Yeshiva of Yeshivas Mir, attests to the special relationship which existed between Shapiro and Rav Elchonon. Even after Shapiro left Baranovich, he continued corresponding with Rav Elchonon.

In the summer of 1936, Shapiro moved to Yeshivas Mir where he immediately gained a reputation as having potential for leading the Torah world and was recognized by Yerucham Levovitz. Shapiro joined students older than himself in sleeping arrangements, despite his young age compared to them. He developed a friendship with such Torah scholars as Yonah Karpilov of Minsk (who was murdered in the Holocaust) and Aryeh Leib Malin. In 1937, Shapiro reached the age of army conscription and made the decision to move to Palestine rather than serve in the Polish armed forces.

In Israel
In Israel, Shapiro attended Yeshivas Lomza in Petah Tikva, where Yechezkel Levenstein recognized his potential. During his time in Lomza, Elazar Shach was the main Talmudic lecturer, while Moshe Shmuel and Rav Shmuel Rozovsky delivered other specialized lectures in Talmud studies. During this time, Shapiro was the teacher of many rabbis, including Chaim Kanievsky.

When Shapiro's first cousin, the Yitzchok Zev Soloveitchik, moved to Jerusalem, Shapiro developed a strong relationship with him and helped publicize the Brisker methods. He was given special access to writings from his cousin and his uncle, Chaim Soloveitchik, which he incorporated into his own understandings of various Gemara sugyas. Shapiro was the main editor of the works of the Brisker Rov on Kodashim.

Shapiro was granted semicha by Rav Isser Zalman Meltzer.

During this period he also became very close to the Chazon Ish Avrohom Yeshaya Karelitz. After his marriage in 1946, Shapiro spent one year learning in the Chazon Ish's kollel (known as Kollel Chazon Ish and then was hired to deliver Talmudic lectures in Yeshivas Kol Torah for three years. At the behest of the Chazon Ish, Shapiro joined Shlomo Wolbe in establishing Yeshivas Be'er Yaakov. He was also the Chief Rabbi of Ramle, the town where his yeshiva was located, for a short time before resigning because it took away too much time from running his Yeshiva.

Shapiro consulted with the Chazon Ish and the Brisker Rov on all yeshiva matters. In 1953, on the day of the death of the Karelitz, Shapiro held a two-hour conversation in Torah with the aging sage.

In 1968, Shapiro was repeatedly asked to join the Moetzes Gedolei HaTorah by the Beis Yisrael, the Gerrer Rebbe, and Yechezkel Sarna. Eventually he acceded to their request when the latter paid him a personal visit.

Works
From the year 1963 until the year of his death, Shapiro published many Talmudic works on the Orders of Nashim, Nezikin, and Moed. They are divided into two sets of books. Kuntres Ha-Biurim are in-depth analysis of various Talmudic topics. Sha'arei Shemu'os is a compilation of Shapiro's novellae arranged by folio of the Talmudic tractates on which he published his works. Shapiro's sons published his work on Tanakh entitled Zahav MiShva. Shapiro also worked extensively with manuscripts of various Rishonim and published an edition of the Ri Migash with his own footnotes.

References

Sources
British Jewry Anticipates Visit Of Harav Moshe Shmuel Shapira
HaRav Moshe Shmuel Shapira zt'l

External links
 Biography of Rabbi Moshe Shmuel Shapira

1917 births
2006 deaths
Rosh yeshivas
Rabbis in Mandatory Palestine
Mir Yeshiva alumni